Tapura magnifolia is a species of plant in the Dichapetalaceae family. It is endemic to Ecuador.  Its natural habitat is subtropical or tropical moist lowland forests.

References

magnifolia
Endemic flora of Ecuador
Near threatened plants
Taxonomy articles created by Polbot